Diepholz (Northern Low Saxon: Deefholt) is a town and capital of the district of Diepholz in Lower Saxony, Germany. It is situated on the rivers Hunte and Lohne, approximately 45 km northeast of Osnabrück, and 60 km southwest of Bremen.

It was the capital of the sovereign County of Diepholz and the principal seat of the Noble Lords, later Counts, of Diepholz.

Notable people
Notable people associated with Diepholz include:
Rudolf van Diepholt (c. 1390–1455), bishop of Utrecht and bishop of Osnabrück
Fritz Klatte (1880–1934), German chemist and the discoverer of polyvinyl acetate 
Eva Leo (1901 in Diepholz – 10 April 1998 in Dubuque, Iowa), German Master Metal Sculptor
Zygfryd Kuchta (born 1944), Polish handball player
Georg Moller (1784–1852), architect and town planner who worked in the South of Germany, mostly in the region today known as Hesse
Marianne of Sweden (died after 1285), Swedish Princess and  countess consort of Diepholz by marriage to Rudolf, Count of Diepholz, whom she married in Nyköping in Södermanland in 1285.

See also 
 Lordship, later County, of Diepholz

References

Diepholz (district)